Jarainda is a medium size village located in Bisauli of Budaun district in the Indian state of Uttar Pradesh with total 306 families residing. The Jarainda village has population of 1861 of which 966 are males while 895 are females as per Population Census 2011.

Education 

There is an old Primary School in Jarainda.

Corporate 
The Village Has an IT(Information Technology) Firm Named 'Macraze Technologies India Private Limited' Registered to It.

References 

 http://wikimapia.org/34046341/Jarenda
 https://www.indiancompany.info/company/macraze-technologies-india-private-limited/
 The name of Village as Jarainda as Jarenda in Budaun district.

Villages in Budaun district